Padalarang Station is a railway station in West Bandung Regency, West Java.

The station is located near the Cihaliwung area and Cihaliwung traditional market, on the heart of the capital city of Western Bandung Regency, the Padalarang town.

The station is located on the western side of Bandung Metropolitan area, it is the junction where two railway routes (Cikampek–Padalarang and Manggarai–Padalarang) merged. It previously had a short branchline that goes into Kertas Padalarang paper mill.

The station will be connected to the Jakarta-Bandung HSR at Padalarang Baru station to the north of existing station, using the station's former ballast loading yard

Services
The following is a list of train services at the Padalarang Station

Passenger services
 Local economy
 Bandung Raya Local, Destination of 

Bandung Urban Railway
To ease traffic congestion at the Greater Bandung roads, the Central government will make Bandung Urban Railway which use electric trains with double tracks line between Padalarang-Cicalengka through Bandung. In November 2011, mapping of Padalarang-Bandung route and feasibility study of Bandung-Cicalengka route have been done by local government.

References

External links

 PT KAI - the Indonesian rail company
 Forum Semboyan35 - Indonesian Rail fans Forum
 Padalarang Train Station

West Bandung Regency
Railway stations in West Java
Railway stations opened in 1884